Tropical Storm Norman was a weak tropical cyclone that brought heavy rainfall to southwestern Mexico in October 2006. The fifteenth named storm of the 2006 Pacific hurricane season, Norman developed on October 9 from a tropical wave well to the southwest of Mexico. Unfavorable conditions quickly encountered the system, and within two days of forming, Norman dissipated as its remnants turned to the east. Thunderstorms gradually increased again, as it interacted with a disturbance to its east, and on October 15 the cyclone regenerated just off the coast of Mexico. Rainfall from the storm flooded about 150 houses, of which 20 were destroyed. One person was injured, and initially there were reports of two people missing due to the storm; however, it was not later confirmed.

Meteorological history

A tropical wave moved off the coast of Africa on September 21, moving across the Atlantic Ocean and Caribbean Sea with little development. On October 1 it entered the eastern Pacific Ocean, and continuing westward it developed an area of persistent convection on October 5. Initially the system was disorganized, although gradual development was expected as conditions in the upper-levels of the atmosphere were expected to become more favorable. On October 7 it developed a broad low pressure area, and by the next day it was located in the eastern portion of a large area of disturbed weather; the western portion of the system later developed into Tropical Storm Olivia.

Upon first becoming a tropical cyclone, the depression was moving north-northwestward, around the western periphery of a weak ridge; the first forecast advisory by the National Hurricane Center (NHC) forecast the depression to gradually intensify before weakening and crossing the Baja California Peninsula. Located over warm water temperatures, the system developed an area of organized, deep convection near the center; with satellite intensity estimates of tropical storm force using the Dvorak technique, the NHC upgraded the depression to Tropical Storm Norman about 12 hours after it first formed. Strengthening continued, and Norman attained peak winds of  early on October 10. At the time, it was officially forecast to strengthen further and continue northeastward. However, some hurricane prediction models anticipated quick weakening and a sharp turn to the southeast. Shortly after peaking in intensity, southwesterly wind shear increased, which led to a decrease in convection coverage. At the same time, a trough extending from California southward caused Norman to stall and turn to the east.

The remnants of Norman continued to the east, and later to the east-southeast as it interacted with a tropical disturbance off the coast of Mexico. Initially, re-development of Norman was not expected, as the disturbance was instead given the possibility for further development. On October 13, the NHC noted that the remnants of Norman were merging with the disturbance to its east; during the interaction, convection redeveloped and organized around the remnant low of Norman, and early on October 15 it reformed into a tropical depression, near the coast of southwestern Mexico. With warm waters and favorable upper-level conditions, Norman was predicted to re-attain tropical storm status before moving ashore. However, the center quickly became less-organized, turning northward and northwestward within the larger tropical disturbance.

Preparations and impact

When Norman redeveloped into a tropical cyclone, the government of Mexico issued a tropical storm warning from Lázaro Cárdenas to Cabo Corrientes.

Flooding from four days of rainfall caused officials to close schools in and around Acapulco. The rainfall resulted in downed trees and mudslides. About 150 homes became flooded, resulting in military personnel to assist in evacuating the flooded houses. In total, 20 homes were destroyed, and 20 villages were left without power. A transport vehicle carrying 15 people was swept away by a flooded stream, resulting in one injury; the truck was later rescued by police workers. About  of crop fields sustained damage; however, little crop damage was reported, as the storm occurred after harvesting had ended. Across Mexico, the storm affected about 500,000 people, and initially there were two people missing; however, a subsequent report indicated there were no casualties associated with the storm.

See also

 Other storms of the same name

References

External links

The NHC's archive on Tropical Storm Norman.

Norman
Norman (2006)
Norman (2006)
2006 in Mexico
Norman